The Olentangy River  is a  tributary of the Scioto River in Ohio, United States.

History
It was originally called keenhongsheconsepung, a Delaware word literally translated as "sharp tool river", based on the shale found along its shores. Early settlers to the region translated this into "Whetstone River". In 1833, the Ohio General Assembly passed legislation intending to restore the original Native American names to some Ohio waterways, but mistakenly gave Whetstone River the name "Olentangy"—Delaware for "river of the red face paint"—which had actually belonged to what is now known as Big Darby Creek.

Geography
The Olentangy River rises in Morrow County approximately 2 mi (3.2 km) southeast of Galion, near Blooming Grove, flowing through Galion and northwest towards Bucyrus, where it then turns south and flows through Eastern Marion County, Ohio (where it is still locally known as the Whetstone River) before flowing south into Delaware County.  The river continues southward towards the communities of Delaware, Powell, Worthington, and the village of Riverlea, before reaching Columbus and the campus of Ohio State University, before joining with the Scioto River in downtown Columbus.  

The Delaware State Park Reservoir, also known as Delaware Lake, was constructed along the Olentangy River in 1951.  The reservoir is located 5 miles north of the city of Delaware, and was built by the U.S. Army Corps of Engineers for flood control purposes. On 13 January 2005, Delaware Dam was nearly overtopped. The water level came within less than 1 foot of the top of the dam, requiring the main spill gates to be opened before it began dropping.

The Olentangy River is the primary source of drinking water for much of Delaware County.  Both the City of Delaware and Del-Co Water Company, the supplier of drinking water to most of rural Delaware County (and other communities beyond), draw the majority of their water supplies from the Olentangy system.

Twenty-two miles of the Olentangy have been designated a State Scenic River by the Ohio Department of Natural Resources, Division of Natural Areas & Preserves.

Variant names
The Olentangy River has also been known as Keenhongsheconsepung, Oleutangy, Whetstone Creek, Whetstone River, and Whitestone Creek.

River restoration

In 2012 the Ohio EPA and the City of Columbus began to remove some of the lowhead dams that cross the river.  Work started with removing the 5th Avenue Dam.  The river is now about half of its former width.  Work continues to restore the banks and clean the area.

Popular culture
Broadcaster Keith Jackson would introduce Ohio State football games "from the banks of the mighty Olentangy."

See also
List of rivers of Ohio

References

External links
 Olentangy Watershed Alliance
 Friends of the Lower Olentangy Watershed
 Delaware Dam level and outflow graph
 Olentangy River Level Gauge at Worthington, OH

Rivers of Ohio
Rivers of Delaware County, Ohio
Rivers of Crawford County, Ohio
Rivers of Franklin County, Ohio
Landforms of Columbus, Ohio